Justin Kwabena Shaibu (born 28 October 1997) is a Danish professional footballer who plays as a forward for Hillerød.

Shaibu began his senior career at HB Køge and transferred to English club Brentford in 2016. After spending four years on the fringes and away on loan, he returned to Denmark and began a nomadic career with a succession of 1st Division clubs. Shaibu was capped by Denmark at youth level.

Club career

HB Køge 
A forward, Shaibu began his career at Vallensbæk IF, before joining the academy at Danish 1st Division club HB Køge at the age of 14. He won his maiden call into the first team squad for a league match versus Horsens on 31 August 2014 and went on to make 9 appearances during the 2014–15 season. Shaibu won the club's Talent of the Year award for the 2014 calendar year. Shaibu played predominantly for the U19 team during 2015–16 and in a season disrupted by injuries he still managed 12 first team appearances and was rewarded with a new three-year contract midway through the campaign. He departed the Herfølge Stadion in July 2016, having made 23 appearances in two seasons.

Brentford 
On 18 July 2016, Shaibu moved to England to sign a two-year B team contract at Championship club Brentford for an undisclosed fee, reported to be £40,000. He received his maiden call into the first team squad as a substitute for an EFL Cup first round match versus Exeter City on 9 August 2016 and made his debut when he replaced Emmanuel Ledesma in extra time during the eventual 1–0 defeat. After five goals in 12 appearances for the B team over the following six months, a lack of fit recognised forwards at the club meant that Shaibu made a minor breakthrough into the first team squad between February and April 2017 and he made four substitute appearances, before an ankle injury ended his season. He scored 10 goals in 18 B team appearances during the 2016–17 season and signed a new three-year contract on 5 May 2017, which saw him promoted into the first team squad for the 2017–18 season.

Shaibu's first appearance of the 2017–18 season came in an EFL Cup first round match versus AFC Wimbledon on 8 August 2017 and his entry onto the pitch during extra time was the first occasion that a fourth substitute had been utilised by Brentford in a competitive fixture. In the final minutes, he scored the first senior goal of his career to seal a 3–1 victory and the strike made him the first-ever fourth substitute to score in a competitive match in England. Shaibu continued in a substitute role, making four further appearances, before dropping out of the squad in October 2017 due to injuries.

From January 2018 onwards, Shaibu spent the remainder of his contract away on loan. He played the second half of the 2017–18 season on loan at League One club Walsall, for whom he failed to score in 14 appearances. He spent the 2018–19 and 2019–20 seasons on loan at National League club Boreham Wood, for whom he made 83 appearances and scored 18 goals during his two loans with the club. Shaibu was released by Brentford in June 2020, after making 10 appearances and scoring one goal during four years at Griffin Park.

Fredericia
On 16 October 2020, Shaibu signed a contract until the end of the 2020–21 season with Danish 1st Division club Fredericia. He made eight appearances and scored two goals before departing the club on 1 February 2021.

Lyngby
On 1 February 2021, Shaibu joined Danish Superliga club Lyngby on a contract running until the end of the 2020–21 season, with an option for one further year. He made six appearances during the remainder of a season which ended with relegation to the 1st Division and departed when his contract expired.

Hobro
On 8 August 2021, Shaibu signed a one-year contract with Danish 1st Division club Hobro on a free transfer. He made 13 appearances and scored two goals during an injury-affected 2021–22 season. Following his departure from the club, he played a period of the 2022–23 pre-season on trial with FC Helsingør, but did not win a contract.

Hillerød 
On 8 September 2022, Shaibu signed a short-term contract with Danish 1st Division club Hillerød on a free transfer. Following six appearances prior to the winter break, Shaibu signed a contract extension until the end of the 2022–23 season on 19 January 2023. He scored his first goal for the club in the club's first match following the resumption of the season, a 2–0 win over Fredericia on 19 February 2023.

International career 
Shaibu won 9 caps for Denmark at U17 and U18 level and scored one goal, which came with the opener in a 2–0 U18 friendly win over Montenegro on 25 September 2014. In early October 2017, Shaibu was called into the U20 squad for two friendlies versus Sweden and appeared in both matches, scoring one goal.

Playing style 
Shaibu stated that he likes "to think I play like Romelu Lukaku. I have got great pace, a lot of energy, a lot of power and I am a great finisher".

Personal life 
Shaibu is of Ghanaian descent through his parents.

Career statistics

Honours 
Boreham Wood

 Herts Senior Cup: 2018–19

Individual

 HB Køge Talent of the Year: 2014

References

External links 
 
 
 Justin Shaibu at hfelite.dk

1997 births
Living people
Danish men's footballers
Danish expatriate men's footballers
Denmark youth international footballers
Footballers from Copenhagen
Danish people of Ghanaian descent
Association football forwards
HB Køge players
Brentford F.C. players
Walsall F.C. players
Boreham Wood F.C. players
FC Fredericia players
Lyngby Boldklub players
Hobro IK players
Danish Superliga players
English Football League players
National League (English football) players
Danish 1st Division players
Danish expatriate sportspeople in England
Expatriate footballers in England
Hillerød Fodbold players